Melvin is a ghost town in Custer  County, in the U.S. state of South Dakota.

History
Melvin contained a post office from 1889 until 1890. The town was named for Melvin Perkins, the son of an early settler.

References

Geography of Custer County, South Dakota
Ghost towns in South Dakota